Wari Warini (Aymara, wari vicuña, the reduplication signifies that there is a group of something, -ni a suffix to indicate ownership, "the one with many vicuñas", or from wari a liquid, wari wari very liquid, also spelled Huari Huarini) is a mountain in the Bolivian Andes, about  high. It is situated in the Cochabamba Department, Quillacollo Province, Quillacollo Municipality, east of the Ipilla Mayu.

See also 
 Jatun Q'asa
 Tunari

References 

Mountains of Cochabamba Department